Bezimeni (trans. The Nameless Ones) were a Croatian and Yugoslav rock band formed in Zagreb in 1961. They are notable as one of the pioneers of the Yugoslav rock scene.

History

1961-1964
Bezimeni were formed in Zagreb in 1961 by Janko Mlinarić "Truli" (vocals, bass guitar), Slaven Rački (guitar), Željko Margetić "Marga" (guitar), Mahmud Ismailovski (tenor saxophone) and Mario Škrinjarić (drums). They were later joined by Petko Katrandžijev (keyboards), and Škrinjarić was replaced by Radovan Krajnović.

The band had their debut performance in the prestigious Zagreb Music Institute. During the following years they would continue to perform there, although they played mostly in Zagreb clubs Medicinar and Ribnjak. They played almost exclusively covers of American rock and roll artists, like Elvis Presley, Bo Diddley and Chuck Berry, in which they differed from other Yugoslav bands of the early 1960s, which often performed covers of popular schlagers. Bezimeni also performed covers of instrumental songs by Johnny and the Hurricanes. The band had one appearance on the Television Zagreb children's show Slavica i Mendo. After spending the summer of 1964 performing in Zadar, Bezimeni ended their activity.

Post breakup
After Bezimeni disbanded, Mlinarić, Rački and Krajnović moved to the band Bijele Strijele. Katrandžijev moved to Delfini, later starting a successful career of pop music composer.

Margetić died in 2000.

2002 reunion
Bezimeni reunited in 2002, performing on the celebration of Croatian national skiing team's success. The band entered the recording studio for the first time, making recordings of their old song "Shadoogie", "Crossfire" and "Revival". The songs were published on the box set Kad je rock bio mlad - Priče sa istočne strane (1956-1970) (When Rock Was Young - East Side Stories (1956-1970)), released by Croatia Records in 2005 and featuring songs by the pioneering Yugoslav rock acts.

Discography
"Shadoogie" / "Crossfire" / "Revival" (Kad je rock bio mlad - Priče sa istočne strane (1956-1970); 2005)

References

External links 
 Bezimeni at Discogs

Croatian rock music groups
Yugoslav rock music groups
Instrumental rock musical groups
Musical groups established in 1961
Musical groups disestablished in 1964